Worthenia is a genus of fossil sea snails, an extinct marine gastropod genus found in the fossil record. This genus is primarily found in rocks formed during the Devonian to Triassic periods (416 million to 200 million years ago) from the central areas of North America. Worthenia was named for the paleontologist Amos Henry Worthen who lived 1813 - 1888.

Worthenia species have a "turban-shaped shell in which a raised ridge follows the margin of the whorls. Small nodes occur along the ridge, and the opening of the shell is oval and large."

References

Lophospiridae
Devonian first appearances
Triassic extinctions